Engenni (Ẹgẹnẹ) is an Edoid language of Nigeria.

Grammar
Engenni is a fairly isolating language, having little affixation. There is no plural form for words. It has definite articles, but no indefinite articles. There is a two-contrast with regards to demonstratives, while pronominal and adnominal demonstratives are identical (as in English). Verbs are marked for perfective/imperfective aspect, but there is no past tense.

Engenni is an SVO language that uses prepositions. Adjectives, demonstratives, and numerals follow the noun they describe. Yes–no questions are marked with a special particle, which goes at the end of the question. Negation is indicated by a change in tone.

Writing System
Engenni has been written since the 1930s, initially in leaflets, posters and religious hymns, or a translation of the Bible. It took several decades before non-religious literary works were published in English. In the 1970s, several literacy works were published by Joycelyn Clevenger or Mosaic Urugba with the Rivers Readers Project. A translation of the New Testament, Baibulu Eba Fai was published in 1977 by World Home Bible League. An alphabet with 9 vowels and 25 consonants is used in epoch.

In 2011, a new alphabet with 10 vowels and 30 consonants was adopted and published.

References

Works cited
 

Edoid languages
Indigenous languages of Rivers State
Isolating languages
Subject–verb–object languages